Charles Eugène Gabriel de Sombreuil (11 July 1770 – 28 July 1795) was a French Royalist commander during the French Revolution. He was born in Bonnac-la-Côte to Charles François de Virot de Sombreuil, the governor of Les Invalides, and Marie-Madeleine des Flottes de l'Eychoisier. He had two older siblings, Marie-Maurille, Mademoiselle de Sombreuil, and Stanislas (both born in 1768). Both Sombreuil's father and brother were executed by guillotine in July 1794.

In July 1795, Sombreuil helped lead the Quiberon expedition. The invasion was a failure, and for betraying the Revolution he and 750 of his fellow soldiers were executed by firing squad.

References 

1770 births
1795 deaths
People from Haute-Vienne
French generals
French counter-revolutionaries